On Your Toes (1936) is a musical with a book by Richard Rodgers, George Abbott, and Lorenz Hart, music by Rodgers, and lyrics by Hart. It was adapted into a film in 1939.

While teaching music at Knickerbocker University, Phil "Junior" Dolan III tries to persuade Sergei Alexandrovich, the director of the Russian Ballet, to stage the jazz ballet Slaughter on Tenth Avenue. After becoming involved with the company's prima ballerina Vera Barnova, Junior is forced to assume the male lead in Slaughter. Trouble ensues when he becomes the target of two thugs hired by Vera's lover and dance partner to kill him.

On Your Toes marked the first time a Broadway musical made dramatic use of classical dance and incorporated jazz into its score.

Films about ballet

Background
On Your Toes originally was conceived as a film, and as a vehicle for Fred Astaire. His refusal of the part, because he thought that the role clashed with his debonair image developed in his contemporary films, caused it to be presented initially as a stage production. Richard Rodgers wrote:  "Astaire at that point in his career was a pretty chic fellow who usually wore white ties and tails, and the producers felt that there was no chance in our script for him to appear that way." Astaire thought that the ballet background in the plot was too "highbrow" for his audiences. Ray Bolger was given the stage role, which allowed him to rise to stardom. Eddie Albert, not known as a dancer in his career, gave a remarkable performance opposite Vera Zorina in the 1939 film.

Productions
The first Broadway production, directed by C. Worthington Miner and choreographed by George Balanchine, opened on April 11, 1936, at the Imperial Theatre, where it ran for seven months, then transferred to the Majestic, for a total run of 315 performances. The cast included Ray Bolger (Junior), Tamara Geva (Vera Barnova), and Monty Woolley (Sergei Alexandrovitch).

The London West End production opened on February 5, 1937, at the Palace Theatre, with Jack Whiting (Junior) and Vera Zorina (Vera Barnova).

The first Broadway revival, directed by Abbott and choreographed by Balanchine, opened on October 11, 1954 at the 46th Street Theatre, where it ran for 64 performances. The cast included Vera Zorina, Bobby Van, Elaine Stritch, and David Winters. The original score was embellished with "You Took Advantage of Me."

The second revival, directed by Abbott and choreographed by Donald Saddler, started in 1982 with national previews. One of the original cast members, Natalia Makarova, was injured during the preview at the John F. Kennedy Center in Washington, D.C. Valentina Kozlova filled in the role, and Leonid Kozlov, her former husband, replaced George de la Peña to complete the previews. After seven previews, the revival opened on March 6, 1983 at the Virginia Theatre with the original cast, where it ran for 505 performances. The cast included Natalia Makarova, Christine Andreas, George de la Peña, George S. Irving, Dina Merrill, Philip Arthur Ross, Betty Ann Grove and Lara Teeter.

The same production opened at the Palace Theatre, London on June 12, 1984, starring Natalia Makarova, Tim Flavin, Siobhan McCarthy and Honor Blackman; it received rave reviews and ran for 539 performances.

Roles and original cast
The main characters in the 1936 Broadway production were as follows:
  
Phil Dolan II – Dave Jones
Lil Dolan – Ethel Hampton
Phil Dolan III,  Junior – Tyrone Kearney, Ray Bolger
Call Boy – Beau Tilden
Lola – Betty Jane Smith
Frankie Frayne – Doris Carson
Sidney Cohn – David Morris
Vera Barnova – Tamara Geva
Anushka – Mae Noble
Peggy Porterfield – Luella Gear
Sergei Alexandrovitch – Monty Woolley
Konstantine Morrosine – Demetrios Vilan
Snoopy – William Wadsworth
Mishka – Valery Streshnev
Vassili – Robert Sidney
Dimitri – Basil Galahoff
Leon – Harold Haskin
Call Boy – Bob Long

Synopsis
Act I

On a vaudeville stage, Phil Dolan II, his wife Lili, and his son Junior perform their nightly routine, but afterwards in the dressing room, the parents tell Junior that he must go to school. Fifteen years later, as predicted, Junior is a music teacher at Knickerbocker University. He has two talented students: Sidney Cohn and Frankie Frayne. Sidney has written a promising jazz ballet which Frankie catches Junior dancing to alone in the classroom (uncovering his "secret past"), and she trades an introduction to the Russian Ballet's manager in return for his listening to her song.

In the apartment of Vera Baranova, star of the Russian Ballet, Peggy, the manager, enthusiastically tells Sergei, the company's director, about the new jazz ballet. He is not interested in anything new - he doesn't even recognise that the Revolution has happened! Junior arrives as Vera and co-star/unfaithful lover Konstantine Morrosine are having a Russian screaming match. The others leave, so that Vera and Junior can discuss the new ballet, but that leads to a new entanglement.

Back in the classroom, Frankie is jealous of Junior's stories about Vera and the Russians (Peggy has promised him a chance to dance in the corps de ballet), and they both wish they were away from it all. At the opening of the ballet, La Princesse Zenobia, Junior is told that one of the dancers is in jail and he must take his place, but onstage he gets all his steps, rhythms and positions cock-eyed and makes a laughing-stock of the ballet. But the audience loves it, nevertheless.

Act II

Sergei, Peggy, Vera, Morrosine and Junior have listened to the jazz ballet. Opinions are mixed, and Vera and Morrosine are still arguing, as he becomes increasingly jealous of Junior. Poor Junior has got love problems, too: he upsets Frankie by going to lunch with Vera (for business reasons) instead of her, but she is "Glad to Be Unhappy".

Then Peggy, Sergei, and some of the company visit Junior's school. Sergei has come to break the bad news that he will not be doing the jazz ballet, but Peggy persuades him by threatening to pull out the million dollars she has put into the company. After Sergei's announcement that the next production will be Slaughter on Tenth Avenue, the class stages the title number "On Your Toes", in which the students' jazz and the company's classical routines are deftly combined.

At a rehearsal, Morrosine's jealousy of Junior escalates, he fights with Sergei and is knocked–out, suddenly making Junior the new star. The humiliated Morrosine plots with his gangster friend, Louie, to shoot Junior at the end of the performance. Joe, the stage doorman, overhears and warns Frankie. On-stage, Junior is tipped–off and signals to the conductor to avoid the final loud climax which would cover the shot, so he keeps the orchestra playing the last few bars of the music over and over as Junior dances frantically to keep the shooter from firing until the police arrest him. After the curtain call, Frankie embraces Junior and is startled to see his parents waiting to congratulate him. The music-teacher has made it back to his home-ground - the stage.

Original song list

Act I
 "Two a Day for Keith" - Phil Dolan II, Lili, Junior
 "Questions and Answers (The Three Bs)" - Junior, Students 
 "It's Got to Be Love" - Frankie, Junior, Students
 "Too Good for the Average Man" - Peggy, Sergei
 "There's a Small Hotel" - Junior, Frankie
 Princesse Zenobia Ballet - Orchestra

Act II
 "The Heart is Quicker than the Eye" - Peggy, Junior
 "Quiet Night" - Students
 "Glad to Be Unhappy" - Frankie
 "On Your Toes" - Frankie, Students
 Slaughter on Tenth Avenue - Orchestra

1983 awards and nominations
Tony Award for Best Revival (winner)
Tony Award for Best Actress in a Musical (Natalia Makarova, winner) 
Tony Award for Best Featured Actor in a Musical (Lara Teeter, nominee) 
Tony Award for Best Featured Actress in a Musical (Christine Andreas, nominee) 
Tony Award for Best Choreography (nominee)
Theatre World Award (Natalia Makarova, winner)
Drama Desk Award for Outstanding Revival (winner) 
Drama Desk Award for Outstanding Actress in a Musical (Natalia Makarova, winner) 
Drama Desk Award for Outstanding Choreography (nominee)
Drama Desk Award for Outstanding Director of a Musical (winner)
Drama Desk Award for Outstanding Orchestrations (winner)
Drama Desk Award for Outstanding Costume Design (nominee)

Film adaptation
In 1939, Warner Bros. filmed On Your Toes as adapted by Sig Herzig and Lawrence Riley and written by Richard Macauley and Jerry Wald, with Ray Enright directing. The film stars ballerina Vera Zorina (billed as Zorina), Eddie Albert, Alan Hale and Frank McHugh, and features Leonid Kinskey, Gloria Dickson, James Gleason, Erik Rhodes, Berton Churchill and Donald O'Connor.

Although some of the songs from the Broadway score were used as background music, the film does not have any singing in it. The Slaughter on Tenth Avenue ballet does appear at the end of the film, with choreography by George Balanchine, one of eight films for which he created the dances. Eddie Albert's character dances the lead in the ballet, opposite Zorina. According to John Reid, "Albert is no dancer...But with the aid of a visual double for one or two shots plus post-synched taps, he actually manages rather well, and even duets with the great Zorina with reasonable facility."

References

External links

On Your Toes on Ovrtur.com
History from R&H Theatricals

 

1939 musical films
1936 musicals
1939 films
Broadway musicals
American films based on plays
Films directed by Ray Enright
Musicals by Rodgers and Hart
Original musicals
Warner Bros. films
West End musicals
Tony Award-winning musicals